The 1995 Ipil massacre occurred on the morning of April 4, 1995, in the municipality of Ipil, then in Zamboanga del Sur province, when approximately 200 heavily armed Abu Sayyaf militants fired upon residents, strafed civilian homes, plundered banks, took up to 30 hostages and then burned the center of the town to the ground.

The militants allegedly arrived in the town by boat and bus, and a number of them had been dressed in military fatigues.

The town's Chief of Police was reportedly killed in the attack and close to a billion pesos were looted from eight commercial banks. Army commandos pursued some rebel gunmen in nearby mountains while officials said that the rebels were looting farms and seizing civilians as "human shields" as they fled the town of About 40 rebels, who may have taken hostages, were cornered in a school compound west of Ipil on April 6 when an elite army unit attacked. In the fighting that followed, the television station GMA reported, 11 civilians were killed.

References

Terrorist incidents in the Philippines in 1995
Mass murder in 1995
Massacres in 1995
Mass shootings in the Philippines
1995 in the Philippines
April 1995 events in Asia
History of Zamboanga del Sur
1995 crimes in the Philippines